The 1968 edition of the Campeonato Carioca kicked off on March 9, 1968 and ended on June 9, 1968. It was organized by FCF (Federação Carioca de Futebol, or Carioca Football Federation). Twelve teams participated. Botafogo won the title for the 14th time. no teams were relegated.

System
The tournament would be divided in two stages:
 First round: The twelve teams were divided into two groups of six, and each team played in a single round-robin format against all other teams. The four best teams in each group qualified to the Second round.
 Second round: The remaining eight teams all played in a single round-robin format against each other. The team with the most points won the title.

Championship

First round

Group A

Group B

Second round

Taça Guanabara

First round

Playoffs

References

Campeonato Carioca seasons
Carioca